Glen Lyon is a glen in the Perth and Kinross area of Scotland.

Glen Lyon or Glenlyon may also refer to:

Places and structures
Glen Lyon, Pennsylvania, US
Glenlyon, Queensland, Australia
Glenlyon, Victoria, Australia
Glen Lyon, Ashgrove, a heritage-listed house in Brisbane, Queensland, Australia
Glenlyon Dam, Queensland, Australia
Glenlyon Range, a mountain range in the Yukon, Canada

Ships
Glen Lyon (ship), a South Korean FPSO vessel
SS Glenlyon, a freighter built in 1893

Other uses
Glen Lyon (album), a 2002 album by Martyn Bennett
Glenlyon Campbell (1863–1917), Canadian politician